The  in the East China Sea are an island chain located 38 km west of the port city of Ichikikushikino, Kagoshima.

Major islands

Minor islands 
All minor islands are currently (as in 2017) uninhabited.

seems to undergo significant erosion and may disappear

History 
The islands once consisted of 14 villages, belonging to Shikijima-gun, Satsuma Province (Satsuma no Kuni) during the Meiji period.  In 1889, the islands were consolidated into Kami-Koshiki and  Shimo-Koshiki villages. In 1897, the islands were merged with Satsuma-gun. Later, Kashima village and Sato village broke off, for a total of four villages. In 2004, during "the great Heisei merger", the villages were merged with the city of Sendai, on the coast of Kyushu.

Important Bird Area
The islands have been recognised as an Important Bird Area (IBA) by BirdLife International because they support populations of Japanese wood pigeons and Pleske's grasshopper warblers.

Attractions
The cruise course visiting many scenic coastal rocks and islets is available from Shimo-Koshiki island.

External links
 Map at Google Maps
 Detailed map of Kami-Koshiki-jima
 Detailed map of Shimo-Koshiki-jima

Archipelagoes of Japan
Japanese archipelago
Islands of Kagoshima Prefecture
Archipelagoes of the Pacific Ocean
Important Bird Areas of Japan